Ernest Pocock (23 October 1878 – 28 July 1951) was a British sports shooter. He competed in the team clay pigeon event at the 1920 Summer Olympics.

References

External links
 

1878 births
1951 deaths
British male sport shooters
Olympic shooters of Great Britain
Shooters at the 1920 Summer Olympics
Place of birth missing